Bartolomé de la Plaza (died 1602) was a Roman Catholic prelate who served as Bishop of Santiago de Cuba (1597–1602).

Biography
Bartolomé de la Plaza was born in Spain and ordained a priest in the Order of Friars Minor.
On 10 November 1597, he was appointed during the papacy of Pope Clement VIII as Bishop of Santiago de Cuba.
In 1598, he was consecrated bishop. 
He served as Bishop of Santiago de Cuba until his death in 1602.

References

External links and additional sources
 (for Chronology of Bishops)  
 (for Chronology of Bishops) 

16th-century Roman Catholic bishops in Cuba
17th-century Roman Catholic bishops in Cuba
Bishops appointed by Pope Clement VIII
1602 deaths
Franciscan bishops
Roman Catholic bishops of Santiago de Cuba